Riachão Ring is a meteorite impact crater in Brazil. It lies within the Parnaíba Basin. The crater is exposed at the surface.

The structure was first identified from analysis of orbital photographs acquired during the Apollo–Soyuz Test Project in 1975.  A reconnaissance investigation of the structure was reported by J. F. McHone in 1977.  The structure of the site (dipping breccia along the rim) supported interpretation of an impact origin, but no shatter cones or shocked quartz were found at the time. 

The crater is severely eroded and there is apparently no ejecta remaining.  The crater rim rises about 50 m above the surrounding surface, and a central uplift is about 30 m above the annular depression within the rim.  Shock deformation has been identified in quartz grains within the central uplift.

References 

Impact craters of Brazil
Jurassic impact craters
Landforms of Maranhão
Geology of Brazil